Church Historian and Recorder (usually shortened to Church Historian) is a priesthood calling in the Church of Jesus Christ of Latter-day Saints. The role of the Church Historian and Recorder is to keep an accurate and comprehensive record of the church and its activities. His office gathers history sources and preserves records, ordinances, minutes, revelations, procedures, and other documents. The Church Historian and Recorder also chairs the Historic Sites Committee and Records Management Committee, and may act as an authoritative voice of the church in historical matters.

History
This office is based on revelations to Joseph Smith calling for keeping records and preparing a church history. Oliver Cowdery, the first in this position, originally recorded meeting minutes, patriarchal blessings, membership information, priesthood ordinations, and a kind of narrative church history. For a time, the callings of Church Historian and Church Recorder were separate, but in 1842 these callings were merged and now the Church Historian also acts as the Church Recorder.

In 1972, the Church Historian's Office was renamed to become the Historical Department. In 2000, this department was merged with the Family History Department to become the Family and Church History Department. On March 12, 2008, the Church Historian separated again from the Family History Department to become the Church History Department.

While the majority of Church Historians and Recorders have been general authorities of the church, there have been some exceptions to the practice.

Assistants
Church Historians and Recorders have often been assisted by individuals called to the position of Assistant Church Historian. Research assistants and other personnel are also usually employed within the Church Historian's Office, but the Church Historian and Assistant Church Historian(s) are the only ones to hold priesthood callings.

Chronology
In the following tables, general authorities are listed in bold. The date ranges span from the sustaining date to the release date unless otherwise indicated.

Church Historian and Church Recorder

Church Historian and Recorder

Church Historical Department
In 1972, the Church Historian's Office was renamed to become the Historical Department. In 2000, this department was merged with the Family History Department to become the Family and Church History Department. On March 12, 2008, the Church Historian separated again from the Family History Department to become the Church History Department.

Executive Director of the Historical Department 

Larsen was also the first Executive Director of the Historical Department, in which he was replaced by John K. Carmack in 1989.  Larsen then moved on to other assignments, such as serving in the Temple Department and Area Presidencies and was not active in any historical role, though he was still technically the Church Historian until his release from the Seventy in 1997.

While holding the office of Church Historian, and afterward, others succeeded Larsen as Executive Directors of the Historical Department.  During this time, these men stood in for the Church Historian and were sometimes referred to with that title.

Notes

References

Further reading

 
  — summary of the role of the Assistant Church Historian
 

1831 establishments in the United States
1831 in Christianity
History of the Church of Jesus Christ of Latter-day Saints
History of the Latter Day Saint movement
Leadership positions in the Church of Jesus Christ of Latter-day Saints